Naofumi (written: 尚文, 尚史 or 脩史) is a masculine Japanese given name. Notable people with the name include:

, Japanese video game composer
, Japanese footballer
, Japanese professional wrestler, boxer and mixed martial artist
, Japanese general

Fictional characters
, the protagonist of the light novel series The Rising of the Shield Hero and The Rising of the Shield Hero S2

Japanese masculine given names